James Michael McConnell and Richard John "Jack" Baker are the first same-sex couple to be married legally with a license that was never revoked. Their wedding became the earliest same-sex marriage ever to be recorded in the public files of any civil government.

McConnell, a librarian, and Baker, a law student, were gay activists in the U.S. state of Minnesota from 1969 to 1980. After their marriage in Minnesota on 3 September 1971, they were invited often to appear publicly at colleges, schools, businesses and churches in the U.S. and Canada.  

In late 1971, the Minnesota Supreme Court in Baker v. Nelson affirmed the lower court order to deny a marriage license to same-sex partners. Their appeal to the U.S. Supreme Court was accepted but later dismissed.

Historians argued, correctly, that neither decision affected McConnell and Baker because the couple obtained a valid license from Blue Earth County when they re-applied in early 1971.

Early years
Born in Norman, Oklahoma (1942), James Michael McConnell was raised and loved by his Baptist parents. After graduating from Norman High School, he attended the University of Oklahoma (OU), ending with an MLS Degree (Master of Library Science). Baker was born in Chicago (1942) and, after both parents died, spent grades 1 - 12 at Maryville Academy, a Catholic boarding school. 

While on active duty (four years) in the U.S. Air Force, Baker was accepted in the Airmen Education Commissioning Program and stationed at OU, where he earned a BSIE degree (Bachelor of Science, Industrial Engineering). He returned to Norman as a civilian – "Boy meets boy" – and invited McConnell to hang out together. With reluctance, his friend agreed to negotiate a serious relationship.

FREE activism
In 1969, weeks before the Stonewall riots, two roommates recruited local friends to join a team called "Fight Repression of Erotic Expression" as part of an outreach program sponsored by Minnesota Free University. Robert Halfhill, a graduate student who attended their lecture, wanted more than "just a social organization". He left, determined to lead an independent group of "FREE" students and activists on the Minneapolis campus (U of M) of the University of Minnesota. 

Attendees elected Jack Baker, a law student, to serve as president. Moving aggressively and openly, FREE slowly transformed Minneapolis into a "mecca for gays", with members soon endorsing McConnell's dream of same-sex marriage.

When a faculty committee qualified the members to receive all privileges enjoyed by student groups, it became "the first student gay organization to gain recognition in the upper mid-west." Its "leaders [believed] it to be the first such organization on a Big Ten campus", and the second such organization in the United States, following the Student Homophile League recognized by Columbia University in 1967. 

One member asked five major companies with local offices to explain their attitudes toward gay men and women. Three responded quickly, insisting that they did not discriminate against gay people in their hiring policies. Honeywell objected to hiring people they knew to be gay. Later in the decade, when faced with a denial of access to students, Honeywell reversed its hiring policy.

In 1971, Baker campaigned to become president of the Minnesota Student Association at the U of M. He was elected, then re-elected. The regents consented to his campaign promise and invited one student to sit with each committee as a non-voting member. That practice proved to be popular and became policy. The Governor later signed into law a bill reserving one seat on the Board of Regents for an enrolled student.

The birth of PRIDE

In 1971, Members of FREE from Gay House invited friends to meet at picnics in Loring Park, near Downtown Minneapolis. Such events, which encouraged  self-pride, began in mid-June as a prelude to local celebrations of Independence Day. Thom Higgins, Prime Archon of the Church of the Chosen People, crafted Gay Pride for the banner that would lead the crowd as it encouraged allies, supporters and bystanders to punish the Catholic archbishop of Saint Paul and Minneapolis for his public condemnation of both the gay life-style and self-pride as sinful.

At the time, Jack was the Chair of the Target City Coalition, parent corporation for The Gay Pride Committee, which sponsored the Festival of Pride each June. Such celebrations spread and became the PRIDE tradition that thrives today in cities throughout the United States.

In 1973, FREE continued working with U of M faculty to protect gay students from discrimination. Central Administration approved the final draft of a new policy in 1972 and the Campus Committee on Placement Services began accepting complaints of unequal treatment by employers recruiting on campus. A member of FREE received class credit for documenting his youth and why he supported America's first gay marriage, which was featured on WCCO-TV.

Same-sex marriage activism
When a modern movement for marriage equality emerged from the U of M, it attracted extensive media attention, including appearances on the Phil Donahue Show; Kennedy & Co. (WLS-TV, Chicago IL); and David Susskind Show (New York, NY). After a professor of history, Allan Spear, mocked them as the "lunatic fringe", admiration among peers spread locally.

Lawsuit to obtain a marriage licence

After McConnell and Baker applied for a marriage license, the clerk's rejection was affirmed by the Minnesota Supreme Court. However, before its "opinion" was published, McConnell re-applied – in a different county – and received a marriage license. The American Civil Liberties Union refused a request for legal support.

Same-sex marriage as a civil right

Speaking to members of the Ramsey County Bar Association, Baker insisted that same-sex unions are "not only authorized by the U.S. Constitution" but are mandatory. Later, Baker spoke to a forum of more than 2,000 at the University of Winnipeg, which Richard North credited as the start of his "fight to be married"<ref>Mia Rabson, "Couple helped make history", Winnipeg Free Press, A4 (17 September 2004). 
 Context: In 2003, a court of appeals in Canada legalized same-sex marriage in the province Ontario. 
 Interview by Canadian Museum for Human Rights is posted online by CBC (Canada, 2004). "Chris Vogel and Rich North of Winnipeg were the first gay couple to legally marry in Canada." 
 North's letter of gratitude to Jack Baker (20 September 2004) is posted online courtesy of the U of M's Michael McConnell Files. "We now have equal marriage in Manitoba, and our efforts here were a direct result of your leadership in Minnesota." GUIDE': Click 'posted online' to view the primary source. If the letter does not appear on your screen, copy-n-paste the hyperlink into a different browser.</ref> to Chris Vogel.

With the outcome never in doubt, marriage became the "civil rights issue of our times" because "the conclusion was intuitively obvious to a first-year law student."

Courts debate their marriage
McConnell's marriage to Baker depended on how Minnesota interpreted its laws. Early results were not favorable. An appeal, sponsored by the Minnesota Civil Liberties Union, was accepted by the U.S. Supreme Court but later dismissed, unanimously. 

Their joint tax return for 1973 was rejected by the Internal Revenue Service. Likewise, the Veterans Administration rejected McConnell's request for spousal benefits. Undaunted, McConnell listed Baker as an adopted "child" on his tax returns for which he received a deduction as head of household from 1974 through 2004. That benefit ended when Congress limited the deduction to an individual under the age of 19.

Adoption, name change, and a lasting marriage
After McConnell adopted Baker, he re-applied in Blue Earth County and received a marriage license, which "was never revoked". Rev. Roger Lynn, a minister from the Hennepin Avenue United Methodist Church, validated the marriage contract at a private home in Minneapolis.Claire Bowes, "Jack Baker and Michael McConnell: Gay Americans who married in 1971" (3 July 2013); available online from BBC News Magazine. "Pastor Roger Lynn holds up Baker and McConnell's marriage certificate" from the ceremony he conducted in Minneapolis.

The Hennepin County Attorney convened a grand jury, which studied the legality of the marriage but found the question not worth pursuing. The Family Law Reporter argued that Baker v. Nelson could not annul a marriage contract that was validated "a full six weeks" before the decision was filed. 

Professor Thomas Kraemer insisted that FREE hosted "the first same-sex couple in history to be legally married". In 2018, "The [1971] marriage is declared to be in all respects valid."

Vindication in later years

The couple obtained a valid marriage license before  the rejection in Hennepin County was appealed to and accepted by the U.S. Supreme Court. Though that case ended in 1972, "for want of a substantial federal question", other challenges followed as they pursued affirmation of their union while living openly as a married couple.

In 1972, Baker led the DFL Gay Rights Caucus at the State Convention of the Minnesota Democratic–Farmer–Labor Party. The caucus persuaded delegates to endorse "legislation defining marriage as a civil contract between any two adults". That vote became the "first known case" of support by a major United States political party for same-sex marriage.

In 2003, Baker and McConnell amended their individual tax returns for the year 2000, filing jointly as a couple, offering proof of a valid marriage license from Blue Earth County. The IRS challenged the validity of the marriage and argued that, even if the license were valid, the Defense of Marriage Act prohibits the IRS from recognizing it. When McConnell brought suit, the U.S. District Court for Minnesota upheld the IRS ruling and the Eighth Circuit Court of Appeals affirmed, saying that McConnell could not re-litigate a question  decided previously.

In 2015, the U.S. Supreme Court answered the question they tried to resolve in 1972: "Do same-sex couples have a constitutional right to get married?" Yes, because all citizens have an inherent right to marry the adult of one's choice. As a friend of the court, Minnesota's Attorney General argued that the Minnesota Supreme Court's "procreation rationale" did not support its prohibition of same-sex marriage.

Employment discrimination at U of M
In 1970, the University Librarian invited Michael McConnell to head the Cataloging Division on the university's St. Paul campus. The Board of Regents refused to approve the offer after McConnell applied for a marriage license and regent Daniel Gainey insisted that "homosexuality is about the worst thing there is."

McConnell sued and prevailed in federal District Court. The Board appealed to the Eighth Circuit Court of Appeals, which agreed that the university did not restrict free speech. Instead, it was McConnell who wanted to implement his "controversial ideas" and foist tacit approval of his "socially repugnant concept" upon the employer. More than 80% of the U of M students objected to the regents' behavior. 

Hennepin County Library, then a diverse and growing system of 26 facilities, hired McConnell. After 37 years of service, McConnell retired as a Coordinating Librarian with gratitude expressed publicly.

In 2012, University of Minnesota president Eric Kaler offered McConnell a personal apology for the "reprehensible" treatment endured from the Board of Regents in 1970. McConnell accepted his assurances and agreed to join the Heritage Society of the President's Club.

Interviews

Short documentary

Further reading
 
 
 
 
 
 
 
 Memoir of Michael McConnell (2016) as told to Gail Langer Karwoski, "The Wedding Heard Heard 'Round the World: America's First Gay Marriage.", Minneapolis, MN: University of Minnesota Press''.

References 

1942 births
20th-century LGBT people
21st-century LGBT people
Living people
LGBT in Minnesota
LGBT people from Minnesota
American LGBT rights activists
Married couples
Same-sex couples